Cosimo Cavallaro (born 1961) is an Italian-Canadian artist, filmmaker and sculptor.  Born in Montreal, Quebec, Canada, Cavallaro is known for his numerous installation art pieces involving real cheese, including a series of photographs of the iconic 1960s model Twiggy draped in cheese and covering the inside of a New York City hotel room with melted cheese.

My Sweet Lord
In March 2007, the Lab Gallery at the Roger Smith Hotel in Manhattan announced that it was canceling its planned "My Sweet Lord" exhibition scheduled for Holy Week because the hotel had received death threats
 following a radio broadcast by Bill Donohue of the Catholic League.   "My Sweet Lord" is a life-size and anatomically correct depiction of Jesus—with neither cross nor loincloth—in an attitude of crucifixion, and sculpted entirely from chocolate.

The sculpture in question is a new version of the original "My Sweet Lord," formed from 200 pounds of chocolate which had been damaged by rodents while it was in storage in Brooklyn. Cavallaro discarded the original piece and recast the sculpture.  The new work is intended to be displayed with a group of chocolate saints, including St. Francis; Augustine; Michael, Jude, Anthony and Fermin—all made by Cavallaro from sweet chocolate.

Bill Donohue was quoted as describing this as "one of the worst assaults on Christian sensibilities ever" and told Cavallaro in a live interview on CNN "you're lucky I'm not like the Taliban, because you would lose more than your head"
. Donohue even accused him of lying about being a Roman Catholic, and even a Christian at all.

Cavallaro won the 1990 Juno Award for Best Music Video for his video for Boomtown, by Canadian singer-songwriter Andrew Cash.  He lives in New York City.

See also
Angela Singer
Chris Savido
David Černý
Piss Christ

References

External links
Official website with large gallery of photos
Photograph of chocolate Jesus

1961 births
Living people
Canadian people of Italian descent
Canadian Roman Catholics
Artists from Montreal
Juno Award for Video of the Year winners
Canadian music video directors
Sculptors from Quebec
21st-century Canadian sculptors
Canadian male sculptors
21st-century Canadian male artists